The Otto Falckenberg Schule – Fachakademie für darstellende Kunst der Landeshauptstadt München, or Otto Falckenberg School of the Performing Arts, is a higher education academy in Munich training actors and directors, affiliated to the Münchner Kammerspiele. It was founded in 1946 as the Städtische Schauspielschule but renamed to its present name on 1 March 1948, after the director and theatre manager Otto Falckenberg. Its current director is Jochen Noch and assistant director Sigrid Herzog.

Alumni
 Monika Baumgartner
 Jens Harzer
 Alexander Held
 Pola Kinski
 Waldemar Kobus
 Joachim Król
 Tobias Moretti
 Franka Potente
 Jeff Wilbusch

External links
 Official website

Buildings and structures in Munich
Educational institutions established in 1946
Drama schools in Germany
Education in Munich
1946 establishments in Germany